

h
H-Cort
H.P. Acthar Gel
H.R.-50

ha

hab-hac
Habitrol
hachimycin (INN)

hal

hala-half
halazepam (INN)
halazone (INN)
halcinonide (INN)
Halcion
Haldol
Haldrone
haletazole (INN)
Halfan
Halflytely

halo
halocarban (INN)
halocortolone (INN)
halofantrine (INN)
halofenate (INN)
halofuginone (INN)
Halog
halometasone (INN)
halonamine (INN)
halopemide (INN)
halopenium chloride (INN)
haloperidol (INN)
halopredone (INN)
haloprogesterone (INN)
haloprogin (INN)
Halotestin
Halotex
halothane (INN)
haloxazolam (INN)
haloxon (INN)

ham-har
hamycin (INN)
Harmonyl

hc
HC (Hydrocortisone)

he

hea-hem
Head & Shoulders Conditioner
Heavy Solution Nupercaine
Hectorol
hedaquinium chloride (INN)
Hedulin
Helicosol
Helidac
heliomycin (INN)
Hemabate
hemoglobin crosfumaril (INN)
hemoglobin glutamer-256 (USAN)
hemoglobin raffimer (USAN)
Hemsol-HC

hep-het
Hep Flush Kit
Hep-Lock
heparin sodium (INN)
Hepatamine 8%
Hepatasol 8%
Hepatolite
Hepflush-10
hepronicate (INN)
Hepsera
heptabarb (INN)
Heptalac
heptaminol (INN)
heptaverine (INN)
heptolamide (INN)
hepzidine (INN)
Herceptin (Genentech, Inc)
heroin, known also as diacetylmorphine and diamorphine and by numerous street names
Herplex
hetacillin (INN)
hetaflur (INN)
heteronium bromide (INN)
Hetrazan

hex

hexa
Hexa-Betalin
Hexa-Germ

hexab-hexal
Hexabrix
hexachlorophene (INN)
hexacyprone (INN)
hexadiline (INN)
hexadimethrine bromide (INN)
Hexadrol
hexafluronium bromide (INN)
hexafocon B (USAN)
Hexal Clofeme (Hexal Australia) [Au]. Redirects to clotrimazole.
Hexal Clotreme (Hexal Australia) [Au]. Redirects to clotrimazole.
Hexal Comfarol Plus (Hexal Australia) [Au].
Hexal Diclac (Hexal Australia) [Au]. Redirects to diclofenac.
Hexalen (US Bioscience)
Hexal PI Antiseptic Ointment (Hexal Australia) [Au]. Redirects to povidone-iodine.
Hexal Ranitic (Hexal Australia) [Au]. Redirects to ranitidine.

hexam-hexas
hexamethonium bromide (INN)
hexamidine (INN)
hexaminolevulinate (USAN)
hexapradol (INN)
hexaprofen (INN)
hexapropymate (INN)
Hexascrub
hexasonium iodide (INN)

hexc-hexy
hexcarbacholine bromide (INN)
hexedine (INN)
hexestrol (INN)
hexetidine (INN)
hexobarbital (INN)
hexobendine (INN)
hexocyclium metilsulfate (INN)
hexoprenaline (INN)
hexopyrronium bromide (INN)
hexylcaine (INN)